Juanita Olukemi Brent (born February 22, 1984) is an American politician serving as a member of the Ohio House of Representatives from the 22nd district since 2019. The district includes the Cuyahoga County communities of Bedford, Bedford Heights, Highland Hills, Maple Heights, Mayfield Heights, North Randall, Orange, Pepper Pike, Warrensville Heights, and parts of Cleveland.

Early life and education
Brent and her siblings were raised by her aunt Vermel Whalen, an Ohio State Representative, after their mother died. She graduated from Beaumont School, an all-girls Roman Catholic high school in 2002.

Ohio House of Representatives

Election
Brent was elected unopposed in the general election on November 6, 2018.

Committee assignments
Brent serves on the following committees:
Commerce and Labor Committee
Transportation and Public Safety Committee
Agriculture and Rural Development Committee (Ranking Member)

Electoral history

References

External links
 Representative Brent's webpage at the Ohio House of Representatives

Brent, Juanita
Living people
21st-century American politicians
21st-century American women politicians
Women state legislators in Ohio
1984 births
African-American state legislators in Ohio
21st-century African-American women
21st-century African-American politicians
20th-century African-American people
20th-century African-American women